Onthophagus fuscopunctatus, is a species of dung beetle found in India, and Sri Lanka.

Description
This minute oval, compact and less convex species has an average length of about 3 to 3.5 mm. Body ochreous yellow and shiny. Head dark, pronotum possess variable black spots. Ventrum partly dark, femora yellowish, whereas tibiae and tarsi are reddish. Dorsum covered with yellow setae. 
Legs fairly slender. Head less broad, shiny, and without close granules. Pronotum fairly sparsely punctate-granular. Elytra deeply striate and punctured with convex intervals. Pygidium with few deep punctures.

References 

Scarabaeinae
Insects of India
Beetles of Sri Lanka
Insects described in 1798